The Pratt & Whitney Canada PW200 is a family of turboshaft engines developed specifically for helicopter applications. It entered service in the 1990s.

Variants
PW205B
First run 1987. Flown in twin-engine MBB BO105 for demonstration only.
PW206A
Maximum continuous power 550 shp (410 kW)  for use on the MD Explorer
PW206B
Maximum continuous power , for use on the Eurocopter EC135
PW206B2
Maximum continuous power .
PW206C
Maximum continuous power , for use on the Agusta A109 Power
PW206E
Maximum continuous power . for use on the MD Explorer
PW207C
Maximum continuous power .
PW207D
Maximum continuous power .
PW207D1
Variant of the PW207 with increased mechanical power, maximum continuous power .
PW207D2
Variant of the PW207D1 with a fuel heater installed, maximum continuous power .
PW207E
Maximum continuous power . for use on the MD 902
PW209T
Maximum continuous power . "Twin-pack" First run 1985, cancelled 1987. Intended for Bell TwinRanger
PW210 Enhanced version of the PW200.

Applications
 AgustaWestland AW109
 AgustaWestland AW169
 Airbus Helicopters H160 (prototype only)
 Bell 360 Invictus (planned)
 Bell 429 GlobalRanger
 Boeing A160 Hummingbird
 Eurocopter EC135
 MD Helicopters MD Explorer
 Sikorsky S-76D

Specifications

References

External links
 Pratt & Whitney Canada PW200 webpage
 Pratt & Whitney Canada PW210 webpage

1980s turboshaft engines
Pratt & Whitney Canada aircraft engines